The Rochdale child sex abuse ring involved underage teenage girls in Rochdale, Greater Manchester, England. Nine men were convicted of sex trafficking and other offences including rape, trafficking girls for sex and conspiracy to engage in sexual activity with a child in May 2012. This resulted in Greater Manchester Police launching Operation Doublet to investigate further claims of abuse with 19 men so far being convicted. Forty-seven girls were identified as victims of child sexual exploitation during the police investigation. The men were British Pakistanis, which led to discussion on whether the failure to investigate them was linked to the authorities' fear of being accused of racial prejudice. The girls were mainly White British.

In March 2015, Greater Manchester Police apologised for its failure to investigate the child sexual exploitation allegations more thoroughly between 2008 and 2010. Sara Rowbotham, the sexual health worker who first recognised patterns of child abuse in the community and fought to bring these crimes to police attention, was made redundant in 2014. A former Detective Constable who was investigating the grooming gangs, Margaret Oliver, resigned in 2012 in disgust of the handling of the cases by the police force and spoke out as a whistleblower to inform the public.

Perpetrators
Twelve men were initially charged with sex trafficking and other offences including: rape, trafficking girls for sex and conspiracy to engage in sexual activity with a child. Nine men were convicted, of whom eight were of British Pakistani origin and one was an Afghan asylum-seeker. Of the three not convicted, one was cleared of all charges, the jury was unable to reach a verdict in the case of the second, and the third was not present at the trial after fleeing to Pakistan whilst on bail. Most of the men were married and well-respected within their community. One gang member convicted of sex trafficking was a religious studies teacher at a mosque and a married father of five. The men were aged between 24-59 and all knew each other. Two worked for the same taxi firm and another two worked at a takeaway restaurant; some came from the same village in Pakistan and another two men shared a flat. The gang worked to secure underage girls to rape and exploit.

Abuse
The abuse of minor female children that occurred in 2008 and 2009 centred around two takeaways in Heywood near Rochdale. Despite one victim going to the police in 2008 to report the child grooming, the Crown Prosecution Service (CPS) decided not to prosecute two men, invoking the witness's lack of credibility.

Attempts by Rochdale Crisis Intervention Team co-ordinator for the NHS, Sara Rowbotham, to alert police and authorities to "patterns of sexual abuse" were ignored. Between 2003 and 2014, Rowbotham made more than 180 attempts to alert police and social services but was told the witnesses were not reliable.

As a result of the CPS dropping the case, the police halted their investigation, which was resumed when a second girl made complaints of a similar nature in December 2009. The CPS's original decision was overturned in 2011 when a new chief prosecutor for the region, Nazir Afzal, a first generation British-Pakistani, was appointed.

The victims, vulnerable teenagers from deprived, dysfunctional backgrounds, were targeted in "honeypot locations" where young people congregated, such as takeaway food shops. One victim, a 15-year-old known as the Honey Monster, acted as a recruiter, procuring girls as young as 13 for the gang. The victims were coerced and bribed into keeping quiet about the abuse by a combination of alcohol and drugs, food, small sums of money and other gifts.

The oldest person to be convicted, Shabir Ahmed, was for a while the main trafficker of the victims. On one occasion he ordered a girl aged 15 to have sex with Kabeer Hassan, as a "treat" for his birthday – Hassan then raped the girl. Abdul Aziz, a married father of three, took over from Shabir Ahmed as the main trafficker and was paid by various men to supply underage girls for sex.

Victims were physically assaulted and raped by as many as five men at a time, or obliged to have sex with "several men in a day, several times a week". The victims, plied with drugs and alcohol, were passed around friends and family, and taken to various locations in the north of England, including Rochdale, Oldham, Nelson, Bradford and Leeds. The abusers paid small sums of money for the encounters. One 13-year-old victim recounted that, after being forced to have sex in exchange for vodka, her abuser immediately raped her again and gave her £40 to not say anything about the incident. Among the incidents recorded by the police were a 15-year-old victim too drunk to recall being raped by 20 men, one after the other; and another victim so drunk that she vomited over the side of the bed as she was being raped by two men. One 13-year-old victim had an abortion after becoming pregnant.

Trial and sentences
Some gang members told the court the girls were willing participants and happy having sex with the men. The ringleader, 59-year-old Shabir Ahmed, claimed the girls were "prostitutes" who had been running a "business empire" and it was all "white lies". He shouted in court, "Where are the white people? You have only got my kind here." Shabir Ahmed's threatening behaviour and calling Judge Gerald Clifton a "racist bastard" resulted in him being banned from the court for the sentencing hearing.

The trial concluded in May 2012 with the nine convictions.
Shabir Ahmed received the longest sentence, 19 years for rape, aiding and abetting a rape, sexual assault, trafficking for sexual exploitation and conspiracy to engage in sexual activity with children. 
Mohammed Sajid was sentenced to 12 years for rape, sexual activity with a girl under 16, trafficking for sexual exploitation and conspiracy to engage in sexual activity with children. 
Kabeer Hassan was sentenced to nine years for rape and conspiracy to engage in sexual activity with children. 
Abdul Aziz received a similar sentence: nine years (concurrently) for trafficking for sexual exploitation and conspiracy to engage in sexual activity with children. 
Abdul Rauf was sentenced to six years for trafficking for sexual exploitation and conspiracy to engage in sexual activity with children. Adil Khan was sentenced to eight years for the same offences. 
Mohammed Amin received a five-year sentence for sexual assault and conspiracy to engage in sexual activity with children. 
Another five-year sentence was given to Abdul Qayyum for conspiracy to engage in sexual activity with children, while Hamid Safi received four years for trafficking for sexual exploitation and conspiracy to engage in sexual activity with children.

Four of the convicted, Shabir Ahmed, Adil Khan, Abdul Rauf and Abdul Aziz, who had dual British and Pakistani citizenships, were denaturalized (stripped of their British citizenship) by then Home Secretary Theresa May in order for them to be deported to Pakistan. May stated the revocations were "conducive to the public good".

Second sex ring and Operation Doublet

Following the break up of the first sex ring in May 2012, the police made arrests in relation to another child sexual exploitation ring in Rochdale. Nine men between 24 and 38 years old were arrested on suspicion of sexual activity with a child. Operation Doublet was launched at the same time as an investigation into child grooming and sexual abuse in the region. Assistant Chief Constable Steve Heywood said that about 550 officers were working on Operation Doublet in May 2013. He said the investigation was at "an extremely sensitive stage" and street grooming was the force's top priority, "a bigger priority than gun crime". He said the investigation was looking at cases in Rochdale dating back to 2003.

In March 2015, ten men aged between 26 and 45 were charged with serious sex offences against seven females aged between 13 and 23 at the time. The alleged offences that took place in Rochdale between 2005 and 2013 included rape, conspiracy to rape, inciting a child to engage in sexual activity, sexual activity with a child, and sexual assault.

Reaction and public debate
The case raised a serious debate about whether the crimes were racially motivated. Suggestions emerged that police and social work departments failed to act when details of the gang emerged for fear of appearing racist, and vulnerable white teenagers being groomed by Pakistani men were ignored. A report by the deputy children's commissioner in 2012 said that 33% of child sex abuse by gangs in Britain was committed by British Asians, where Asians are 7% of the population, but concluded that it was "irresponsible" to dwell on the data.

Ann Cryer, Labour MP for Keighley, recalled in a BBC documentary filmed in 2012 that she had worked with the families of the victims involved, and had been "round at the police station virtually every week" and was "begging" both the police and social services to do something. Cryer said, "Neither the police nor social services would touch those cases. I think it was because they were afraid of being called racist." Cryer had attempted to reach the Muslim community and persuade it to take action: "I went to a friend of mine, who was a local councillor and happened to be a Muslim and therefore able to represent me to the elders, because I thought it was a good move to try to get those elders involved. I hoped that I would be able to persuade the elders to go knocking on doors and say 'this behaviour is un-Islamic and I want it to stop because I'm going to tell the whole community about you and what you’re doing if you don’t'. Now they weren’t prepared to do that."

Tim Loughton, the Minister for Children and Families, said that while there was no evidence that ethnic communities condoned child sexual abuse, he was concerned that some had been slow to report it to the police, and urged police and social workers not to allow "political correctness around ethnicity" to hinder their work to apprehend such criminals.

In late 2011, the Office of the Children's Commissioner began a two-year long inquiry into child sexual exploitation by street gangs. The inquiry issued its final report in November 2013. After members of the Rochdale gang were sentenced, the UK's Department for Education announced new funding for a specialist foster care scheme to protect vulnerable children in residential care, where some victims had been.

The Times report of 5 January 2011
A report by The Times on 5 January 2011, related to convictions for child sex grooming in the North and Midlands. Of the 56 offenders convicted since 1997 for crimes relating to on-street grooming of girls aged 11 to 16, three were white, 53 were Asian of which 50 were Muslim, and most were from the British Pakistani community. Furthermore, The Times article alleged: "with the exception of one town there is scant evidence of work being undertaken in British Pakistani communities to confront the problem" of "pimping gangs" largely consisting of "members of the British Pakistani community".

The findings have been questioned by researchers Ella Cockbain and Helen Brayley, from whose work for the UCL Jill Dando Institute of Security and Crime Science The Times report had drawn much of its evidence. "The citations are correct but they have been taken out of context," Cockbain told The Independent; "Nor do they acknowledge the small sample size of the original research, which focused on just two large cases." Cockbain and Brayley expressed concern that "findings were being overextended from a small, geographically concentrated sample to characterise an entire crime type".

Coalition for the Removal of Pimping
Hilary Willmer, representing a Leeds-based support group for parents of sexually exploited girls, the Coalition for the Removal of Pimping (Crop), was quoted as saying "The vast majority [of] perpetrators are Pakistani Asians", with sources inside Crop claiming a percentage as high as 80 per cent although, The Independent said that "Kurdish, Romanian and Albanian gangs were also involved". Willmer added: "We think this is the tip of the iceberg", although she cautioned against treating the matter as a race crime: "It's a criminal thing." By May 2012, according to The Independent, Crop had "gone suddenly silent" concerning the percentage of abusers of Asian origin who had come to the organisation's attention: Willmer explained to the paper: "We've been accused of being a cover for the BNP".

Child protection organisations
In 2011, the Child Exploitation and Online Protection Centre launched a five-month long investigation into whether there was a link between racial profile and the crime of underage grooming. The organisation defined underage grooming as any situation where a child or young person received a gift in exchange for sexual favours. It drew statistics from organisations such as Barnardo's but the findings were considered inconclusive by expert academics because not all the figures had been compiled in the same way and ethnicity had not always been noted with each reported crime. Ella Cockbain and Helen Brayley pointed out, "There is no criminal offence of 'on-street grooming' and as a result it is very difficult to measure the extent of the crime based on court statistics." Further research has been pursued since late 2011 by the Office of the Children's Commissioner.

Wendy Shepherd, child sexual exploitation project manager for Barnardo's in the north of England, said that since she started working with the organisation, there has been "a shift from the men selling children in ones or twos to something that is much more organised in groups and networks. The networks of men come from different backgrounds: in the North and Midlands many have been British Asians; in Devon it was white men; in Bath and Bristol, Afro-Caribbeans; in London, all ethnic mixes, whites, Iraqis, Kurds, Afghans, Somalis". She noted that white male predators on the street tend to work alone. She added: "The danger with saying that the problem is with one ethnicity is that then people will only be on the lookout for that group – and will risk missing other threats."

The former head of Barnardo's, Martin Narey, said on BBC Radio 4's Today programme: "For this particular type of crime, the street grooming of teenage girls in northern towns … there is very troubling evidence that Asians are overwhelmingly represented in the prosecutions for such offences." Narey rejected the idea that such gangs were specifically targeting white girls, but suggested vulnerable girls on the street were more likely to be white since Asian girls were subjected to strict parenting and were more likely to be kept off the streets.

Response from Muslim spokespeople
In a BBC documentary investigating grooming young girls for sex by some Pakistani men, Imam Irfan Chishti from the Rochdale Council of Mosques deplored the practice, saying it was "very shocking to see fellow British Muslims brought to court for this kind of horrific offence." Mohammed Shafiq, chief executive of the Ramadhan Foundation, accused elders of the Pakistani community of "burying their heads in the sand" on the matter of sexual grooming. He said that of convictions involving child sexual exploitation, 87% were of British Pakistani men and it was a significant problem for that community. He said the actions of criminals who thought "white teenage girls are worthless and can be abused" were "bringing shame on our community."

Sayeeda Warsi, co-chairperson of the Conservative Party, in an interview with the Evening Standard, said "You can only start solving a problem if you acknowledge it first," and added, "This small minority who see women as second class citizens, and white women probably as third class citizens, are to be spoken out against." She described the Rochdale case as "even more disgusting" than cases of girls being passed around street gangs, as the perpetrators "were grown men, some of them religious teachers or running businesses, with young families of their own."

Nazir Afzal, who as the newly appointed chief crown prosecutor decided to bring the case to trial, said that sex, not race, was the key issue: "There is no community where women and girls are not vulnerable to sexual attack and that's a fact."

Hindu and Sikh objections
Hindu and Sikh groups have objected to media use of the "Asian" description saying that the culprits were "almost always of Pakistani origin" and "Muslim". They contend that clouding the issue by calling them "Asians" is unfair towards other groups and detrimental to a frank discussion.

Taxi controversy
Two of the convicted gang members worked at Eagle Taxis, which was taken over by Car 2000 after the scandal. The company's owner said that due to requests, clients could choose to have a white driver but this was reversed after 50 Asian drivers protested.

Moral panic
One study suggested that the British media's portrayal of South Asian men as perpetrators of sexual violence against white victims is an example of a moral panic. In particular they pointed out that the inquiry by the Office of the Children's Commissioner found that, while a majority of victims were white and a majority of perpetrators were men of South Asian descent, there were many cases where "perpetrators and their victims were ethnically diverse."

BBC series
In May 2017, the BBC broadcast Three Girls, a miniseries about the case. Actress Maxine Peake starred in the series as Sara Rowbotham, the sexual health aid worker who first uncovered the patterns of severe abuse in the area, but struggled to bring it to the attention of authorities. Actress Lesley Sharp played the police detective Margaret Oliver in the series.

2020 Home Office report
The Rochdale case was one of several cases which prompted investigations looking into the claim that "the majority of the perpetrators have been British Pakistani"; the first was by Quilliam in December 2017, which released a report entitled "Group Based Child Sexual Exploitation – Dissecting Grooming Gangs", which claimed 84% of offenders were of South Asian heritage. However this report was "fiercely" criticised for its unscientific nature and poor methodology by child sexual exploitation experts Ella Cockbain and Waqas Tufail, in their paper "Failing Victims, Fuelling Hate: Challenging the Harms of the 'Muslim grooming gangs' Narrative" which was published in January 2020.

A further investigation was carried out by the British government in December 2020, when the Home Office published their findings, showing that the majority of child sexual exploitation gangs were, in fact, composed of white men and not British Pakistani men.

Research has found that group-based child sexual exploitation offenders are most commonly white. Some studies suggest an overrepresentation of black and Asian offenders relative to the demographics of national populations. However, it is not possible to conclude that this is representative of all group-based CSE offending. 

Writing in The Guardian, Cockbain and Tufail wrote of the report that "The two-year study by the Home Office makes very clear that there are no grounds for asserting that Muslim or Pakistani-heritage men are disproportionately engaged in such crimes, and, citing our research, it confirmed the unreliability of the Quilliam claim".

Review of police actions
In December 2013, the case review by Rochdale County was leaked, which highlighted findings from an internal police investigation. The review acknowledged that police officers might have discriminatory attitudes towards the victims, that the victims were interviewed by detectives without training in child exploitation and no strategy when victims returned to their abusers. One example mentioned was the issue of child protection for one of the victims, which was discussed in 40 meetings, without any record of police attendance. Also cited were a lack of managerial oversight in 2008 and 2009 and lack of resources and managerial support for the investigations despite formal requests. Finally, officers did not challenge a Crown Prosecution Service decision not to prosecute. The review recommended the Greater Manchester Police establish a monitoring system and commit to maintaining a child sexual exploitation team.

On 13 March 2015, Greater Manchester Police apologised for its failure to investigate child sexual exploitation allegations more thoroughly between 2008 and 2010. The apology was made after a review by the Independent Police Complaints Commission "examined the conduct and actions of 13 officers who were involved in Operation Span and the policing of Rochdale Division." Operation Span was the investigation launched in December 2009 into allegations made against the individuals who were convicted in 2012, and others. Assistant Chief Constable Dawn Copley said that, at the time of the earlier investigation, "there was a strong target driven focus, predominantly on serious acquisitive crime. At best this was distracting for leaders and influenced the areas that resources were focused on". She said that seven officers had been served with misconduct notices, but no further disciplinary action would be taken against them. Copley said: "We apologise to the victims and we give them our assurance that lessons have been learned, changes have been made and we are determined to use this to continue making improvements."

One of the seven officers retired without any sanctions being taken, even though his misconduct was found to have warranted disciplinary action.

See also

List of sexual abuses perpetrated by groups
Post-assault treatment of sexual assault victims
Jimmy Savile sexual abuse scandal

References

External links
 The Rochdale Borough Safeguarding Children Board, Review of Multi-Agency Responses to the Sexual Exploitation of Children 
 House of Commons Home Affairs Committee Child sexual exploitation and the response to localized grooming: Second Report of Session 2013–14, Vol. 1
 House of Commons Home Affairs Committee Child sexual exploitation and the response to localized grooming: Second Report of Session 2013–14, Vol. 2

2008 crimes in the United Kingdom
2008 in England
2009 crimes in the United Kingdom
2009 in England
2012 in England
Child prostitution in the United Kingdom
Child sexual abuse in England
Crime in Greater Manchester
Forced prostitution
History of Rochdale
Human trafficking in the United Kingdom
Street gangs
Pakistani-British gangs
Rape in England
Sex crimes in England
Sex trafficking
Sex gangs
Racism in England
Denaturalized citizens of the United Kingdom
Child grooming
Incidents of violence against girls
Gang rape in Europe